The 2023–2025 ICC World Test Championship is a future tournament of Test Cricket which will be the third edition of the ICC World Test Championship. It starts in June 2023 with The Ashes, which is contested between England and Australia, and it is scheduled to finish in June 2025 with the final match planned to be played at Lord's.

Format 
The tournament will be played over two years, with 68 matches over 27 series scheduled for the league stage. The top two teams in the points table will then qualify for the final which will be played at The Lord's, London. Each team is planned to play six series, with three at home and three away. Each series will consist of two to five Test matches. Each participant will play between 12 to 22 matches. Each match is scheduled for a duration of five days.

Participants 
The nine full members of the ICC who will participate are:

 
 
 
 
 
 
 
 
 

The three full members of the ICC who are not eligible to participate:

Schedule 
The International Cricket Council (ICC) announced the 2023–2027 Future Tours Programme on 17 August 2022 and identified which series will be a part of the World Test Championship. Rather than being a full round-robin tournament in which everyone will play everyone else equally, each team played only six of the other eight as in the previous cycles. The exact dates and the venues of these series will be decided by the boards of the competing teams.

League table

League stage

2023

The Ashes (England v Australia)

Sri Lanka v Pakistan

West Indies v India

2023–24

Bangladesh v New Zealand

Benaud-Qadir Trophy (Australia v Pakistan)

Freedom Trophy (South Africa v India)

Frank Worrell Trophy (Australia v West Indies)

Anthony de Mello Trophy (India v England)

New Zealand v South Africa

Trans-Tasman Trophy (New Zealand v Australia)

Pakistan v West Indies

Bangladesh v Sri Lanka

2024

Richards-Botham Trophy (England v West Indies)

Sir Vivian Richards Trophy (West Indies v South Africa)

Pakistan v Bangladesh

England v Sri Lanka

India v Bangladesh

Sri Lanka v New Zealand

2024–25

Pakistan v England

India v New Zealand

Bangladesh v South Africa

Border-Gavaskar Trophy (Australia v India)

West Indies v Bangladesh

New Zealand v England

South Africa v Sri Lanka

South Africa v Pakistan

Warne-Muralitharan Trophy (Sri Lanka v Australia)

Final

References 

ICC World Test Championship